Gabe Miller (born December 5, 1987) is a former American football linebacker. He was drafted by the Kansas City Chiefs in the fifth round of the 2011 NFL Draft. Miller played college football as a defensive end and tight end at Oregon State University.

He has also been a member of the Seattle Seahawks, Chicago Bears, and Washington Redskins.

Professional career

Kansas City Chiefs
Miller was selected by the Kansas City Chiefs in the fifth round of the 2011 NFL Draft. Having played the defensive end position in college, he was converted to a linebacker.

Seattle Seahawks
On September 7, 2012, Miller was signed to the practice squad of the Seattle Seahawks, where he moved to the tight end position.

Chicago Bears
Miller was signed to the Bears practice squad after the departure of Dedrick Epps. On June 4, 2013, Miller was suspended for four games by the league for violating the league's substance policy. He was eventually released by the team on August 25, 2013.

Washington Redskins
On December 24, 2013, Miller was signed to the practice squad of the Washington Redskins. He signed a reserve/future contract with the team on December 31, 2013. After spending the last two years playing tight end, the Redskins converted him back to the outside linebacker position. On September 27, 2014, he was waived by the Redskins, but re-signed to their practice squad on September 29. He was promoted to the active roster on December 6.

On May 4, 2015, he was waived by the Redskins.

References

External links
Oregon State Beavers bio
Chicago Bears bio
Washington Redskins bio

1987 births
Living people
American football defensive ends
American football linebackers
American football tight ends
Chicago Bears players
Kansas City Chiefs players
Lake Oswego High School alumni
Oregon State Beavers football players
Players of American football from Oregon
Seattle Seahawks players
Sportspeople from Lake Oswego, Oregon
Washington Redskins players